The 1906 Massillon Tigers football season  was their fourth season in existence. The team finished with a record of 10-1 and won their fourth Ohio League championship in as many years. However a scandal, revolving around the Tigers championship game against the Canton Bulldogs, tainted the 1906 title and, along with escalating player salaries, reportedly helped ruin professional football in Ohio until the mid-1910s.

Schedule

Game notes

References

Massillon Tigers seasons
1906 in sports in Ohio
Massillon Tigers